Guinn Run  is a Pennsylvania stream flowing southeastward in the Gettysburg National Military Park from Cemetery Hill past the Gettysburg Museum and Visitor Center to Rock Creek.  The stream was bridged by the 1809 Gettysburg and Petersburg Turnpike Company and in the commemorative era by the United States War Department when Hunt and Slocum Avenues were built.  A dam was built on Guinn Run to form a pond for Fantasyland, Pennsylvania, through the 1960s and 1970s.

See also
List of rivers of Pennsylvania

Rivers of Adams County, Pennsylvania
Rivers of Pennsylvania
Tributaries of the Monocacy River